Big Game is the name given to the California–Stanford football rivalry. It is an American college football rivalry game played by the California Golden Bears football team of the University of California, Berkeley, and the Stanford Cardinal football team of Stanford University. Both institutions are located in the San Francisco Bay Area. First played in 1892, it is one of the oldest college rivalries in the United States. The game is typically played in late November or early December, and its location alternates between the two universities every year. In even-numbered years, the game is played at Berkeley, while in odd-numbered years it is played at Stanford.

Series history

Big Game is the oldest college football rivalry in the West. While an undergraduate at Stanford, future U.S. President Herbert Hoover was the student manager of both the baseball and football teams.  He helped organize the inaugural Big Game, along with his friend Cal manager Herbert Lang.  Only 10,000 tickets were printed for the game but 20,000 people showed up. Hoover and Lang scrambled to find pots, bowls and any other available receptacles to collect the admission fees.

By 1900 the match was already referred to as the "Big Game". In 1898, Berkeley alumnus and San Francisco Mayor James D. Phelan purchased a casting of Douglas Tilden's The Football Players bronze sculpture and offered it as a prize to the school that could win the football game two years in a row. Berkeley responded by shutting Stanford out in 1898 and 1899, and the sculpture was installed on the Berkeley campus atop a stone pedestal engraved with the names of the players and the donor during a dedication ceremony held May 12, 1900.

During the 1900 Big Game, played at the Recreation Park stadium on Thanksgiving Day in San Francisco, a large group of fans were observing from the roof of the nearby S.F. and Pacific Glass Works factory. With somewhere between 600 and 1,000 spectators atop it, the rooftop collapsed, resulting in well over 100 men falling to the factory's floor and more than 60 directly onto the massive, blazing furnace. In total 23 men and boys were killed, and more than 100 severely injured. To this day, the "Thanksgiving Day Disaster" remains the deadliest accident to kill spectators at a U.S. sporting event.

In 1906, citing concerns about the violence in football, both schools dropped football in favor of Rugby, which was played for the Big Games of 1906–14. During that time the matches were played under Union rules of rugby per an agreement between Stanford and Cal coaches along with other West coast teams, including Nevada, St. Mary's, Santa Clara, and USC (in 1911) In 1915, Cal switched back to American football.  Its official reason for withdrawal from its 1915 rugby match against Stanford was the disagreement over Stanford's play of freshmen on their varsity team, however it was apparent that Cal intended to withdraw from the agreement to play rugby and instead play football against western schools that continued playing football or switched back several years earlier. Cal's Big Game was played in the years 1915–17, against Washington, games which aren't listed in Big Game records. Cal lost its 1915, home Big Game to University of Washington 72–0, while Stanford played rugby against its new Big Game opponent Santa Clara University, beating them 30–0. Stanford played rugby for two more years.

The 1918 game, in which Cal prevailed 67–0, is not considered an official game because Stanford's football team was composed of volunteers from the Student Army Training Corps stationed at Stanford, some of whom were not Stanford students. In 1919, Stanford officially switched back to playing football.

The first incidence of card stunts was performed by Cal fans at the halftime of the 1910 Big Game.

California resumed playing football in 1915, but Stanford's rugby teams continued until 1917. From 1915 to 1917, California's "Big Game" was their game against Washington, while Stanford played Santa Clara as their rugby "Big Game". The game resumed as football in 1919, and has been played as such every year since, except from 1943 to 1945, when Stanford shut down its football program due to World War II. A handful of Stanford starters—including guards Jim Cox, Bill Hachten and Fred Boensch, running back George Quist and halfback Billy Agnew—shifted to Cal in order to continue playing. Quist returned to Stanford, playing against Cal in the 1946 Big Game.

Scenes for the Harold Lloyd silent classic The Freshman were filmed at California Memorial Stadium during halftime of the 1924 Big Game.

Since 1933, the victor of the game has been awarded possession of the Stanford Axe. If a game ended in a tie, the Axe stayed on the side that already possessed it; this rule became obsolete in 1996 when the NCAA instituted overtime. The Axe is a key part of the rivalry's history, having been stolen on several occasions by both sides, starting in 1899, when the Axe was introduced when Stanford yell leader Billy Erb used it at a baseball game between the two schools.

In March 2007, the National Football League announced that it intended to trademark the phrase "The Big Game" in reference to the Super Bowl, but soon dropped the plan after being faced with opposition from Cal and Stanford.

In 2013, the new Levi's Stadium in Santa Clara was proposed as the site of the 2014 Big Game, which according to the traditional rotation should be played at Cal's Memorial Stadium.  The 2015 game would then be held in Berkeley, reversing the current rotation of odd-numbered years at Stanford and even-numbered years at Cal. However, several days later Cal declined the offer.

Pregame traditions

In the week before the game, both schools celebrate the occasion with rallies, reunions, and luncheons. Cal students hold a traditional pep rally and bonfire at the Hearst Greek Theatre on the eve of the game, while Stanford students stage the Gaieties, a theatrical production that both celebrates and pokes fun at the rivalry. The week also includes various other athletic events including "The Big Splash" (water polo), "The Big Spike" (volleyball), "The Big Sweep" (Quidditch), "The Big Freeze" (ice hockey), "The Big Sail" (sailing), and the Ink Bowl, a touch football game between the members of the two schools' newspapers. Cal celebrates in San Francisco with an annual cable car rally, hosts a tree chopping rally, has singing competitions, and night rallies through all of the dorms.

Cal

The Big Game Bonfire Rally is a pep and bonfire rally that takes place at University of California, Berkeley in Hearst Greek Theatre on the eve of Big Game. More than 10,000 students gather to hear the history about The Stanford Axe and Big Game. The University of California Rally Committee is in charge of the planning and setting up the bonfire, as well as refueling it during the rally. Specifically, freshman members of the UC Rally Committee, as well as freshman band members are sent out with pallets to the chanting of "freshmen, more wood." Several alumni show up to perform traditional rituals. A tradition unique to Cal is the performance of the Haka, a traditional Maori war dance/chant. Traditionally performed by an alumni Yell Leader, the Haka performed was written in the 1960s by a Cal rugby player of Maori descent. The traditional Axe Yell is also made and visits from the UC Men's Octet and Golden Overtones are always expected.  The University of California Marching Band is also present, playing traditional Cal songs throughout the duration of the Rally. The highlight of the Rally is the lighting of Big Game Bonfire itself, with the fire reaching its zenith at over eight stories.

The Big Game Bonfire Rally always ends with the reciting of a speech known as the "Andy Smith Eulogy" or "The Spirit of California". Written by Garff Wilson in remembrance of the fabled Cal football coach, who led the Bears to five straight undefeated seasons starting in 1919 before tragically dying of pneumonia in 1925, the speech closes the Rally annually since 1949.  During the speech, candles are passed out among the attendants and are lit for the singing of the campus alma mater, "All Hail Blue and Gold."

In 2012, the Big Game Bonfire Rally was moved to Edwards Stadium and the bonfire was cancelled due to a scheduling conflict with a Bob Dylan concert. Due to TV contracts, the Pac-12 Conference rescheduled the Big Game from its traditional season-ending slot to October 20, and the Greek Theatre was already booked for the Bob Dylan concert. This was the first time the bonfire had not been held since 1892. The bonfire portion of the rally was cancelled again in 2015 due to the ongoing drought. In 2016, the Fiat Lux torch was added as a symbol of light, with, "For the flames of the past, spirit of the present, and light of the future" engraved on it. In 2018, the big game was rescheduled due to the unhealthy air quality caused by the Camp Fire. All fire/pyrotechnical elements were cut from the rally. The UC Rally Committee immediately began preparations to re-invent the traditional wood burning structure, as they did not want the fire to extinguish like it had almost 30 years earlier at Stanford. In November 2019, a new sheet metal bonfire structure was unveiled.

Stanford
For decades, Stanford also held a bonfire on the dry lakebed of Lake Lagunita, but this was discontinued in the 1990s due to the lake being a habitat for the vulnerable California tiger salamander. Stanford now holds a Big Game Rally on Angell Field organized by the Stanford Axe Committee. With appearances from the senior football players and various performance groups, it serves to kick off Big Game Week. The story of The Stanford Axe is told by Hal Mickelson, and the Axe Yell is performed by the Yell Leaders of The Stanford Axe Committee. The rally ends with a performance by the Leland Stanford Junior University Marching Band and a fireworks show. A student-produced play called "Gaieties," an annual Big Game week tradition since 1911, pokes fun at Cal and serves to pump students up for the Big Game. Another part of Stanford's tradition was the annual hanging of the substantial "Beat Cal" banner upon the four story Meyer Library building. This tradition came to an end in 2014 before the building was demolished. Since 2015, the banner has been hung over the western entrance to Green Library.

Notable games

1924
Both teams came into the game unbeaten with a berth in the 1925 Rose Bowl on the line. With its star Ernie Nevers sidelined due to injuries, Stanford trailed 20–6 with under 5 minutes to go, but rallied to score twice to force a 20–20 tie and earn the Rose Bowl bid.

1947
In the 50th Big Game, winless Stanford led the 8–1 Bears with less than three minutes left in the game, but Cal scored on an 80-yard touchdown pass to clinch a 21–18 victory.

1959
Stanford quarterback Dick Norman threw for 401 yards (then an NCAA record, and still a Big Game record), but it was not enough to hold off the Bears, who won 20–17.

1972
Cal drove 62 yards in the final 1:13, culminating in a Vince Ferragamo touchdown pass to Steve Sweeney for a last-second 24–22 Cal victory.

1974
Mike Langford nailed a 50-yard field goal on the final play for a 22–20 Stanford triumph over the 19th-ranked Bears.

1982: The Play

The conclusion of the 85th Big Game on November 20, 1982, would go down as perhaps the most remarkable play in college football history. Cal held a lead late in the game, but Stanford, led by John Elway, drove down the field to retake the lead, and seemingly elevate Elway to the first bowl game of his college career, since a Stanford victory would have resulted in an invitation to the Hall of Fame Bowl.

In what is now known simply as "The Play," four Cal players lateraled the ball five times on a kickoff return with four seconds left on the clock. Kevin Moen, who was also the initial ball carrier, ran for a touchdown while knocking down the final Stanford "defender," trombone player Gary Tyrrell, who had run onto the field with the rest of the band to celebrate prematurely.

The Play is often recounted with KGO radio announcer Joe Starkey's emotional call of The Play, which he hailed as "the most amazing, sensational, dramatic, heartrending, exciting, thrilling finish in the history of college football!" The legitimacy of The Play has remained controversial among some Stanford fans.  The final outcome was a Cal victory by a score of 25–20.  There is contention as to whether the play was correctly officiated, however. 

In 2007, as part of the buildup to The Play's 25th anniversary, the Bay Area News Group asked Verle Sorgen, the Pac-10 Conference's supervisor of instant replay, to review the two disputed laterals according to modern NCAA instant replay review rules. After watching enhanced footage on a modern, large-screen monitor, Sorgen opined that the fifth lateral from Ford to Moen "was released at the 22 and touched at the 20-1/2. From that, it clearly appears forward." Asked for his "ultimate call," Sorgen replied, "I would be tempted to reverse it...then go out and get the motor running in my car."

1986 
Cal was 1–9 in the conference, while Stanford was 7-2 and ranked 16th in the nation. Cal's defense dominated the game - Stanford's quarterback John Paye was sacked seven times, while Stanford's running game was held to 41 yards. Cal won the game 17–11. It was the last game of Cal's coach Joe Kapp, who also coached the Golden Bears in 1982, his first season, when Cal won the Big Game following The Play.

1988
With the score tied, Cal marched to the Stanford 3-yard line with 4 seconds remaining in the game. Called "the Cadillac of kickers in college football" by Cal coach Bruce Snyder, all Pac-10 and future all-American Robbie Keen lined up for a 21-yard field goal attempt to win the game on the final play. When the ball was snapped, Stanford redshirt freshman Tuan Van Le raced from the left end of the defensive line to block the kick and preserve a 19–19 tie. As Stanford was the holder of the Axe going into the game, the tie meant the Axe returned to the Farm for another year. The result was celebrated in the stadium as a victory by Stanford as the Axe was paraded by the Stanford Axe Committee and football players before jubilant Cardinal fans, with stunned Bears fans looking on. This was the only Big Game to end in a tie after 1953 and, under current overtime rules, may be the last Big Game to end tied.

1990
This game had echoes of the 1982 game due to late seesaw scoring, the critical role of fans on the field, and the winning points being scored as time expired.  It has been called "The Payback" or "The Revenge of the Play" by Stanford fans.

After trailing since the first quarter, left-footed Stanford kicker John Hopkins kicked his fourth field goal of the game with 9:56 left to give Stanford its first lead at 18–17. Cal responded with a touchdown, and added a two-point conversion to lead 25–18 with 6:03 left. Stanford stopped Cal on a third and 6 on the Stanford 46 with 2:06 left to play. After Cal's punt, Stanford took its final possession on its own 13 with 1:54 left. Escaping two near interceptions and converting a 4th and 6, Stanford moved the ball to the Cal 19 with seventeen seconds left. After quarterback Jason Palumbis threw a touchdown pass to Ed McCaffrey in the end zone to make it 25–24, Cardinal coach Dennis Green quickly went for a two-point conversion, with no overtime, and despite the fact that a tie would keep the Axe at Stanford for another year.

After Palumbis' pass into the end zone was intercepted by John Hardy, Cal fans, players and team officials - believing they had won the game and the Axe - invaded the field and caused a lengthy delay before police, stadium security and officials restored order, with officials assessing Cal a 15-yard delay of game penalty.

Now kicking from the 50-yard line with twelve seconds left, Hopkins bounced the ensuing onside kick off a Cal player and, after being touched by seven players, the ball was recovered by Stanford's Dan Byers on the Cal 37. With nine seconds left and no time outs remaining, a pass attempt to McCaffrey to set up a field goal fell short, but officials assessed Cal a 15-yard penalty after Palumbis was roughed on the play, moving the ball to the 22-yard line. With five seconds remaining, Hopkins kicked a 39-yard field goal into the wind, giving Stanford a 27–25 victory as time expired, with Stanford fans, players and team officials invading the field in celebration.

The late passing and kicking excitement overshadowed two excellent running performances by Cal's Russell White (177 yards and 2 TD's) and Stanford's Glyn Milburn (196 yards and 1 TD). Milburn also led Stanford receiving with 9 receptions for 66 yards and had 117 return yards: His 379 all-purpose yards set a Pac-10 record at the time and remained Stanford's record until it was eclipsed by Christian McCaffrey's 389 all-purpose yards in the 2015 edition of the Big Game.

2000
Stanford's Casey Moore caught the winning touchdown on the final play of the first-ever Big Game to go into overtime.

2009
Cal's Michael Mohamed intercepted an Andrew Luck pass at the Cal 3-yard line with 1:36 left to preserve a Cal win over #14 Stanford, 34–28. It was also a rare Big Game where both teams were nationally ranked.

2010
Sixth-ranked Stanford, in a 48–14 victory, ties Cal's 1975 record for most points scored in a Big Game.

2013
Winning 63–13, #10 Stanford set the record for most points scored in a Big Game, shattering the previous record of 48 shared by Cal in 1975 and Stanford in 2010.  The 50-point victory margin also set a Big Game record, breaking the previous record that had stood for 83 years when Stanford beat Cal 41–0 in 1930. The 76 total points scored by both teams broke the record of 66 set in 2000.  With the victory, Stanford clinched the Pac-12 North Division Championship while Cal ended its season at 1–11, the most losses in one season in Cal football history.

2018 
The 2018 Big Game was originally scheduled to be played on November 17, but was rescheduled to December 1 at 12:00 noon, because of unhealthy air quality in the Bay Area caused by the Camp Fire.  Stanford continued its streak, winning for the ninth time in a row, beating Cal 23–13.

2019 
Down 20–17 with 2:23 remaining, the Cal offense engineered a six-play, 75-yard drive culminating in a 16-yard touchdown run from quarterback Chase Garbers to give the Bears their first lead of the game. Cal linebacker Evan Weaver sealed the 24–20 victory for the Bears with a dramatic fourth-and-one stop on Cardinal running back Cameron Scarlett on the subsequent possession, setting off a raucous celebration on Stanford's home turf as the Axe returned to Berkeley after nearly a decade away.

2020 
In the COVID-19 pandemic-shortened 2020 season, both Cal and Stanford entered the game with 0–2 records on the season, with each team previously having a game cancelled due to COVID infections. Cal opened scrimmage with a dominant 8 play, 75-yard touchdown drive. However, three punts each by both teams, a muffed punt recovered by Stanford at Cal's 16 (resulting in a touchdown), and a last-second blocked field goal attempt by Cal from the Stanford 32 as time expired left the game tied at 10–10 to enter halftime. A third-quarter fumble at Cal's 41 provided Stanford with good scoring position, leading to a touchdown three plays later and giving Stanford their first lead of the game, 17–10. Trailing 24–17 with 4:28 left in the fourth, Cal completed a 14 play, 90-yard drive starting from their own 10 yard-line to score a touchdown with 58 seconds remaining in regulation. Now trailing by just one point with the score at 24–23, Cal coach Justin Wilcox signaled for a 1-pt PAT, which was blocked by Stanford's Thomas Booker. Cal attempted an unsuccessful onside kick, and  Stanford recovered the Axe four plays and 11 yards later, taking it back to the Farm for the 10th time in 11 seasons.

Game results

Rivalry in other sports

In other sports, matchups between Cal and Stanford feature their own nicknames based on the word "big." Examples include:

Men's and women's soccer - The "Big Clasico".
Men's and women's rowing - The "Big Row" now in honor of Cal coxswain Jill Costello who died of stage 4 lung cancer in 2010.
Men's and women's track and field - The "Big Meet"
Volleyball – The "Big Spike"
Men's basketball - The "Big Tipoff"
Water polo – The "Big Splash"
Ice hockey – The "Big Freeze"
Sailing - The "Big Sail," held at St. Francis Yacht Club in San Francisco

In rugby, the two schools have a trophy of their own called the "Scrum Axe". In men's basketball the semiannual matchups are sometimes labeled the "Big Game" but it is not official. In women's basketball, the meetings are simply called the "Battle of the Bay."

See also 

 List of NCAA college football rivalry games
 List of most-played college football series in NCAA Division I
Stanford Axe
1906–17 Stanford rugby teams
California Golden Bears rugby

References

External links

Stanford Magazine feature on Big Game
The Play
Transcript of Joe Starkey's call of the Play
Discussion about the filming of 1925 film, The Freshman at Big Game
Stanford Daily article on the history of Big Game
Big Game Videos Summary of the entire 1982 game on mReplay.com

College football rivalries in the United States
California Golden Bears football
Stanford Cardinal football
American football competitions in California
American football in the San Francisco Bay Area
Events in the San Francisco Bay Area
1892 establishments in California
Recurring sporting events established in 1892